Lempi Maria Tuomi (28 August 1882 in Virrat - 24 March 1958) was a Finnish seamstress and politician. She was a member of the Parliament of Finland from 1922 to 1923, representing the Socialist Workers' Party of Finland (SSTP). She was imprisoned from 1923 to 1924 on sedition charges.

References

1882 births
1958 deaths
People from Virrat
People from Vaasa Province (Grand Duchy of Finland)
Socialist Workers Party of Finland politicians
Members of the Parliament of Finland (1922–24)
Prisoners and detainees of Finland
20th-century Finnish women politicians
Women members of the Parliament of Finland